Jatki may refer to:
Jatki, West Pomeranian Voivodeship, village in north-western Poland
Jatki language, several languages with the name

See also
 Rutki-Jatki, a village in north-eastern Poland